Farewell, My Lovely is a novel by Raymond Chandler, published in 1940, the second novel he wrote featuring the Los Angeles private eye Philip Marlowe. It was adapted for the screen three times and was also adapted for the stage and radio.

Plot
Private detective Philip Marlowe is investigating a dead-end missing person case when he sees a felon, Moose Malloy, barging into a nightclub called Florian's, looking for his ex-girlfriend Velma Valento. The club has changed owners, so no one there now knows her. Malloy ends up killing the black owner of the club and escaping. The murder case is assigned to Lt. Nulty, a Bay City police detective who has no interest in the murder of a black man. Marlowe advises Nulty to look for Malloy's girlfriend, but Nulty prefers to let Marlowe do the routine legwork and rely on finding Malloy based on his huge size and loud clothes. Marlowe decides to follow up and look for the girl.

He tracks down Mrs Jessie Florian, the widow of the nightclub's former owner, and plies her with bourbon. Mrs Florian claims Malloy's girlfriend is dead. Before making further progress, Marlowe receives a call from a man named Lindsay Marriott, who claims his friend has been robbed and requests Marlowe's presence in delivering a ransom payment for stolen jewellery. Later that evening, in a deserted canyon, Marlowe waits in the dark and is hit on the head from behind. When he awakes, Marriott is dead. A passerby, Anne Riordan, finds him and takes him home.

Lt. Randall, the cunning but honest Los Angeles cop investigating Marriott's murder, is skeptical about the story. At Marlowe's office, Anne explains that she is from Bay City, a policeman's daughter interested in local crime. Her father was cashiered by the corrupt cops running the Bay City Police. She tells Marlowe that she learned from Randall that the stolen necklace belongs to a Mrs Lewin Lockridge Grayle, the young wife of a wealthy and influential Bay City resident. Mrs Grayle is a ravishing blonde whom Grayle met when she was singing for the radio station he owned. She married him in Europe under an assumed name, to keep her background secret. Anne offers to have her hire Marlowe to find the necklace.

Marlowe examines some marijuana cigarettes he found on Marriott's body and discovers the card of a psychic, Jules Amthor. He makes an appointment to see him. On a hunch, he investigates Mrs. Florian's house and discovers that Marriott held a trust deed on it, meaning he could foreclose on her at will. Following up with Mrs Florian, she reveals she was once a servant for Marriott's family, and Marlowe suspects she was somehow blackmailing him. Marlowe visits Mrs Grayle, who finds him attractive and hires him, which he can use as an excuse to continue investigating the two murders. They make a date to meet again at the club of a local hoodlum, Laird Brunette, near the spot where Marriott was killed.

At Amthor's office, Marlowe probes him for his connection to Marriott and the drugs. Amthor calls in a pair of Bay City detectives out of their jurisdiction to arrest Marlowe, claiming Marlowe tried to blackmail him, but instead of taking him to jail, they knock him unconscious and lock him up in a private hospital run by Dr. Sonderborg, a drug dealer who keeps him docile with drug injections. Marlowe escapes, but on the way out, he sees Malloy in another room. He discusses the case with Randall, who is annoyed at his persistence in investigating the case. They suspect Marriott of blackmailing wealthy women, in league with Amthor, and return to Mrs Florian's, only to find her murdered, apparently shaken to death by Malloy.

Because of the involvement of the Bay City cops whom Amthor called in, Marlowe visits the corrupt Bay City police chief, John Wax, who brushes him off until Marlowe mentions that he has been hired by Mrs Grayle. Marlowe is then told that Malloy may be hiding out on a gambling boat anchored beyond the three-mile limit and run by Brunette, who also controls the corrupt city government in Bay City. Marlowe sneaks on board with the help of Red Norgaard, another honest cop fired by Bay City, and despite being caught by Brunette, persuades him to pass a message through his criminal network to Malloy.

Marlowe calls Mrs Grayle, ostensibly to have her pick him up at his apartment for their date. Responding to Marlowe's message, Malloy shows up first, and hides when Mrs Grayle arrives. Marlowe confronts her: she is Velma and had used Marriott to keep Mrs Florian in line after she recognised Velma's voice on Grayle's radio station. Marriott had worked as an announcer at the same station. Mrs Grayle convinced Marriott to set up Marlowe to be killed in the canyon, but actually did so to kill Marriott because she viewed him as a 'weak link' who would reveal her secret past. She had also informed on Malloy about the robbery that sent him to prison. When Malloy hears this, he steps out to confront Velma, who shoots him fatally and flees. Amthor, Sonderborg, and the crooked cops are all exposed; Red gets his job back. Velma flees, but when she is eventually tracked down in Baltimore, she kills the detective who recognizes her, and commits suicide when cornered.

Characters

Philip Marlowe
Lt. Nulty
Lt. Carl Randall
Moose Malloy
Mrs. Jessie Florian
Lindsay Marriott
Jules Amthor
Dr. Sonderborg
Mr. Lewin Lockridge Grayle
Mrs. Lewin Lockridge Grayle, also known as Velma Valento
Laird Brunette
Anne Riordan
John Wax

Background 
Chandler worked on the book from June to December 1939, before destroying the entire typescript and starting again. He completed the novel in the spring of 1940.

Farewell, My Lovely, like many of Chandler's novels, was written by what he called cannibalising previous short stories—taking previously written short stories and altering them to fit together as a novel. This practice is sometimes known as a fix-up. In this case the three stories were "Try the Girl", "Mandarin's Jade", and "The Man Who Liked Dogs".

"Try the Girl" provided the initial story about a hoodlum looking for his old girlfriend who has moved on to a more respectable life. "Mandarin's Jade" was the basis for the middle sections about a jewel theft which may or may not have actually happened, the murder of a blackmailer, and a corrupt psychic who works with a crime ring. "The Man Who Liked Dogs" provided the final part, where the detective is looking for a criminal and his search ultimately takes him to a gambling boat anchored off the Santa Monica coast, out of reach of the local law.

In all of the initial stories, the criminals and motives are clearly explained by the end. However, as Chandler adapted and integrated the stories—which were originally written completely independently—he cared more about the style of writing and the characters than about making sure every plot point fit together with consistency and lucidity. As he said of his work, "my whole career is based on the idea that the formula doesn't matter, the thing that counts is what you do with the formula; that is to say, it is a matter of style." Chandler used this writing style to develop his themes of corruption, social decay, cynicism and fatalism.

Chandler used recognizable locations in Los Angeles as settings, but he created the fictional town of Bay City as a stand-in for Santa Monica, known for its widespread corruption in city government during the Great Depression. The title of the novel is apparently a reference to a song in the 1935 musical revue At Home Abroad.

Film adaptations
Farewell, My Lovely was the first Philip Marlowe novel to be filmed. In 1942, The Falcon Takes Over, a 65-minute film that was the third in the Falcon series about Michael Arlen's gentleman sleuth Gay Lawrence (played by George Sanders), used the plot of Farewell, My Lovely. In 1944, Dick Powell played the part of the hard-boiled detective, named Philip Marlowe this time, in a classic film noir release—alternatively entitled Murder, My Sweet (in the United States) and Farewell, My Lovely (in the UK)—two years before cinema-goers saw Humphrey Bogart as Philip Marlowe in The Big Sleep (1946).  In 1975, Robert Mitchum starred in a remake of Farewell, My Lovely.
Although not technically an adaptation, the "Harlem Nocturne" episode of the television series The New Mike Hammer (Aired 26 November 1986 on CBS) borrowed major plot details from the novel's story of the search by a huge ex-con for his former girlfriend and criminal partner, including the fight in the bar and someone deliberately identifying a photo incorrectly and then being killed.

Radio adaptations
The novel was adapted on BBC Radio 4 by Bill Morrison, directed by John Tydeman and broadcast on 22 September 1988, starring Ed Bishop as Marlowe. BBC Radio 4, as part of its Classic Chandler series, also broadcast on 19 February 2011 a dramatic adaptation by Robin Brooks, with Toby Stephens as the hardboiled detective. It was adapted in a condensed form under the title of Murder My Sweet on Hollywood Star Time, broadcast on 8 June 1946, starring Dick Powell.

Cultural references
In the first shot after the opening titles of Get Carter, the character played by Michael Caine is seen reading a paperback copy of the book.

In the opening episode of the television series Bored to Death, the character Jonathan Ames, played by Jason Schwartzman, is inspired to become a private detective after reading the book.

The novel's title was used as the subtitle of the Japanese version of the video game Sakura Wars V, but this reference was lost in the translation.

The fourth and final case in the video game Phoenix Wright: Ace Attorney − Justice for All is called "Farewell, My Turnabout," a reference to the novel's title.

In 2015 video game, The Witcher 3: Wild Hunt, the title of the mission "Va Fail, Elaine" translates into "Farewell, beauty," a reference to the novel's title.

References

External links
 
Outline of the plot by William Marling (includes an explanation of some literary allusions)

1940 American novels
1940 British novels
Alfred A. Knopf books
American novels adapted into films
British novels adapted into films
American detective novels
Hardboiled crime novels
Novels by Raymond Chandler
Novels set in Los Angeles